Biloxi National Cemetery is a U.S. National Cemetery that is located in Biloxi, Mississippi on the grounds of the Department of Veterans Affairs Medical Center (VAMC), near Keesler Air Force Base.

History 
Biloxi National Cemetery was established in 1934 and its first burial was held on March 24, 1934.

From 1934 to 1973 the purpose of Biloxi National Cemetery was to provide a final resting place solely for veterans who died in the adjoining medical center. In 1973 with the passage of the National Cemetery Act, the burial ground was opened to all honorably discharged veterans, active duty personnel, and their dependents regardless of where they died. Since its establishment, the grounds have increased in size twice as the result of land transfers from the VAMC.

Notable markers 
A granite marker located in front of the cemetery's administration building was donated by the National Association of Atomic Veterans on November 9, 1990, in memory of the veterans who participated in the U.S. nuclear weapons testing program.

Notable burials 
 Medal of Honor recipient
 Colonel Ira C. Welborn (1874–1956), for actions in the Spanish–American War
 Others
 Uncle Elmer (1937–1992), professional wrestler
 June Gardner (1930–2010), R&B drummer and bandleader
 Forest Sterling (1911–2002), author of Wake of the Wahoo, a book about the WWII submarine 
 Lamar Williams (1949–1983), popular music bassist

References

External links 
 National Cemetery Administration
 Biloxi National Cemetery
 
 
 

1934 establishments in Mississippi
Cemeteries in Mississippi
Buildings and structures in Biloxi, Mississippi
United States national cemeteries
Protected areas of Harrison County, Mississippi
Historic American Landscapes Survey in Mississippi